Locicortolone (developmental code name RU-24476), or locicortone, is a synthetic glucocorticoid corticosteroid which was never marketed.

References

Primary alcohols
Organochlorides
Diketones
Glucocorticoids
Pregnanes
Abandoned drugs